The Remedy debugger was the first embedded system level debugger in the world. It offered many features that users take for granted today in the days when having a source level debugger was a luxury. Some of these features include:
 Multiprocessor operation
 Heterogeneous
 Distributed
 Dynamic thread view of the system
 Synchronized debugging for multiple threads
 Trace functions
 Operating system resource displays
 Source and assembly level debugging

It started as an academic research project (originally called Melody for debugging the Harmony Operating System). The results were published in one of the early papers on debugging multiprocessor systems.

The current version of Unison Operating System continues to use both gdb and Remedy debugger.

References

Debuggers